Miloslav Kordule (born 23 June 1968) is a Czech former football player. He made 212 appearances in the Gambrinus liga, scoring 18 goals.

Honours

Club

 FK Viktoria Žižkov
 Czech Cup: 1994

References

External links
 

1968 births
Living people
Czech footballers
Czechoslovak footballers
Czech First League players
FK Viktoria Žižkov players
FK Jablonec players
FC Hradec Králové players
Association football defenders